Milagros Leal (2 December 1902 – 2 March 1975) was a Spanish actress.

Selected theatrical works
 La estrella de Justina (1925)
 Mariquilla Terremoto (1930).
 Anacleto se divorcia (1932).
 La propia estimación (1941)
 Los habitantes de la casa deshabitada (1942).
 Blanca por fuera y rosa por dentro (1943).
 El pañuelo de la dama errante (1945).
 El sexo débil ha hecho gimnasia (1946).
 Don Juan Tenorio (1947).
 Víspera de bodas (1948).
 Doña Clarines (1951).
 Women's Town (1953).
 La muralla (1954)
 Enriqueta sí, Enriqueta no (1954).
 Los intereses creados (1956)
 La novia del espacio (1956)
 El pan de todos (1957).
 Ondina (obra de teatro) (1958)
 Un soñador para un pueblo (1958).
 Anna Christie (obra de teatro)|Anna Christie (1959)
 Medea (1959).
 Hamlet (1960).
 Divinas palabras (1961).
 De profesión sospechoso (1962).
 Tomy's Secret (1963).
 La barca sin pescador (1963).
 Los árboles mueren de pie (obra teatral)|Los árboles mueren de pie (1963).
 Ligazón (1966).
 El baño de las ninfas (1966).

Selected filmography
 The Nail (1944)
 Lessons in Good Love (1944)
 The Phantom and Dona Juanita (1945)
 The Holy Queen (1947)
 Anguish (1947)
 Our Lady of Fatima (1951)
 Spanish Serenade (1952)
I Was a Parish Priest. (1953)
 Such is Madrid (1953)
 Flight 971 (1953)
 The Louts (1954)
 Judas' Kiss (1954)
 The Big Lie (1956)
 We Thieves Are Honourable (1956)
 Queen of The Chantecler (1962)
 The Fair of the Dove (1963)
 The Man Who Wanted to Kill Himself (1970)

References

Spanish stage actresses
Spanish film actresses
1902 births
1975 deaths
20th-century Spanish actresses